The 383rd Infantry Division was formed during the winter of 1941/42, as part of the 18th wave. All infantry divisions of this wave, numbers 383 to 389, were referred to as “Rhine Gold” divisions. 

After its formation, the division was transferred to the Eastern Front in April 1942.
The division was first integrated into the 2nd Army of Army Group B. In March 1943 it joined the 9th Army of Army Group Center with which it took part in Operation Citadel (Battle of Kursk).

When the Soviets launched Operation Bagration on 23 June 1944, The division was surrounded during the Bobruysk Offensive and destroyed. It was officially dissolved on 3 August 1944.

Commanders
Generalleutnant Johannes Haarde (26 January 1942 – March 1942)
Generalmajor Eberhard von Fabrice (March 1942 – November 1942)
Generalleutnant Friedrich-Wilhelm John (November 1942 – July 1943)
Generalmajor Edmund Hoffmeister (1 July 1943 - 20 June 1944)
Generalleutnant Adolf Hamann (20 June 1944 - 28 June 1944) : POW.

Sources
Lexikon der Wehrmacht
axis history

Infantry divisions of Germany during World War II
Military units and formations established in 1942
Military units and formations disestablished in 1944